The South Asia Partnership Pakistan (SAP-PK) is a registered with the Government of Pakistan and functions under the Societies Registration Act 1860. non-governmental organization working in Pakistan.

History 
South Asia Partnership-Pakistan (SAP-PK) was founded by a group of leading Pakistani development and social activists in 1987.  As a member of South Asian civil society, SAP-Pakistan is striving to empower marginalized sections of society and working to influence policies in favor of just practices and equal opportunities for marginalized communities. SAP-Pakistan promotes citizens alliances, women's participation in political processes, peace and conflict prevention and aims at creating demand for access to social services and rights. SAP-Pakistan's’ strengths are in its work in communities, human development, advocating for rights and system reforms.

SAP-Pakistan is one of the leading and well experienced national organization in Pakistan with significant contribution in the areas of promoting public accountability and people's voices for good and responsive governance and pro-poor policies. SAP-Pakistan's struggle for a transparent and accountable governance model encompasses a broad array of diverse practices. There are several core elements that remain crucial and manifest in its approach. These include; accessing information; making the voice of citizens heard and engaging in the processes of negotiation for reform. It has a demonstrated capability of leading large advocacy campaigns, actions and programs in all four provinces and FATA. This network includes more than 2500 community groups and various civil society organizations. Through one of its initiatives for democracy and governance SAP-PK is present in 5000 villages working with cross sections of society especially with rural poor including women and non-Muslims.

SAP-Pakistan's advocacy approach includes generating relevant information in public domain and various forms of direct-state interaction including community level meetings with government officials or indirect mediated forms of consultation and negotiations involving key stakeholders. As a result of this approach and subsequent practices, SAP-PK has achieved various successes and created a huge potential in four major dimensions i.e. citizen-state bridging mechanisms; attitudes and capacities of citizens and civil society actors; attitudes and capacities of state actors; an enabling environment.
At present most of SAP-Pakistan's community groups, networks and advocacy alliances at provincial and national level are actively engaged in making the government and elected representatives to the account for their policies and decisions.

Organization 
SAP-PK derives its name from a regional network, i.e. South Asia Partnership. This is a volunteer network of participatory development-support organizations operating under the same name and for the same purposes in Canada and four South Asian countries, Bangladesh, Nepal, Pakistan and Sri Lanka. Peace and Regional Cooperation, Gender and Development, Democratic Governance, Poverty and Sustainable Livelihood, Human Security and Safe Environment are core themes of SAP-PK. They work together in the context of a common charter.

Relationships 
SAP-Pakistan is an active member of various global forums that promote regional and global alliances of citizens and their organizations, to help advance regional and national agendas of common initiatives to strengthen the capacity of civil society. This includes peasants and rural workers, women, religious minorities and other marginalized groups.
Since 1987 SAP-PK has worked with more than 10 funders and spent approximately PKR 1800 million on its different development programs and campaigns. Its main funders include Department for International Development (DFID) (or UK-Aid), Canadian International Development Agency (CIDA), Swiss Agency for Development and Cooperation (SDC), Oxfam, Pakistan Poverty Alleviation Fund (PPAF), Church World Service (CWS), European Commission (EC) / European Union (EU), Agha Khan University (AKU), The Asia Foundation, United Nations Development Programme (UNDP), 26 Canadian NGOs supported community projects and local philanthropists. In recent years SAP-PK has started exploring funders especially building its local resource base. Some successes have been made to raise local funds. Its program portfolio and funding base also reflects that it has successfully reached out to several active external and local funding sources.

Programs 
SAP-Pakistan's work includes programs on poverty alleviation, agriculture development, livestock and dairy development, building rural infrastructure and creating livelihood solutions for the rural poor. The organization claims their development schemes have benefited around 3.5 million people, mainly women, ultra poor, landless, home-based workers and other marginalized groups. Their rural development models include efficient use of irrigation and transformed community schemes, in nearly 150 villages in the districts Layyah, Rajanpur, D.I.Khan, Gawadar, Ormara, Khyber Agency, Bhakkar and many more.

SAP-Pakistan's work has been extensively monitored and evaluated by its main funders including DFID, CIDA, SDC, EU and PPAF and many others. Most of these evaluation and monitoring missions have endorsed its achievements and contribution to the marginalized sections of the society and its participatory, transparent and accountable management style.

Outreach: SAP-Pakistan has four provincial offices with multiple strategic partners in numerous districts across the country. These well-established partner organizations and networks are aligned with SAP-PK's development vision and strategic direction, and also extend their full support to operate as support centers for smaller organizations and communities. This approach has enabled SAP-Pakistan to manage extensive networks and communities without incurring high operational and administrative costs. SAP-PK has a national Secretariat in Lahore. SAP-Pakistan has a large network of community groups, peasants and workers groups (PWGs) in 5000 villages (in all, four provinces and FATA/PATA), district and provincial level networks of these community groups, an advocacy network comprising 3000 civil society organizations and 1550 trained social activists who have undergone more than year-long training with SAP-PK.

SAP-Pakistan has been actively working with government at district, provincial and federal levels. It has served on different committees and board constituted by the government such as Social Action Program, Social Welfare Department, Planning Commission and Rural Development and Devolution and Ministry of Information. SAP-Pakistan is a gender sensitive and responsive organization that follows gender justice policies and values in all its organizational, programme and field operations. Its governing bodies and staff composition reflects affirmative gender treatment with clear preference for women and other marginalized groups.

References

Non-profit organisations based in Pakistan
Economic development organizations